This article describes the personal pronoun systems of various Austronesian languages.

Proto-languages
The Proto-Austronesian and Proto-Malayo-Polynesian personal pronouns below were reconstructed by Robert Blust.

In 2006, Malcolm Ross also proposed seven different pronominal categories for persons. The categories are listed below, with the Proto-Austronesian first person singular ("I") given as examples.
Neutral (e.g., PAN *i-aku)
Nominative 1 (e.g., PAN *aku)
Nominative 2 (e.g., PAN *=ku, *[S]aku)
Accusative (e.g., PAN *i-ak-ən)
Genitive 1 (e.g., PAN *=[a]ku)
Genitive 2 (e.g., PAN *(=)m-aku)
Genitive 3 (e.g., PAN *n-aku)

The following is from Ross' 2002 proposal of the Proto-Austronesian pronominal system, which contains five categories, including the free (i.e., independent or unattached), free polite, and three genitive categories.

Formosan languages

Rukai
Below are Rukai pronouns from Zeitoun (1997). Paul Jen-kuei Li's classification of Rukai dialects is given for reference.

Rukai
Mantauran (萬山 Wanshan) – 250-300 speakers
(Main branch)
Maga-Tona
Maga (馬加 Majia)
Tona (多納 Duona)
Budai-Tanan (Rukai Proper)
Budai (霧台 Wutai)
Tanan (大南 Danan)

Tsouic
The personal pronouns below are from the Tfuya dialect of Tsou, and are sourced from Zeitoun (2005:277). Note that third-person pronouns are distinguished between those that are visible (abbreviated vis. below) or non-visible.

Northwestern Formosan

Pazeh
The Pazeh personal pronouns below are from Li (2000). (Note: vis. = visible, prox. = proximal)

Saisiyat
Saisiyat has an elaborate pronominal system (Hsieh & Huang 2006:93).

Thao
The Thao personal pronouns below are from Blust (2003:207). Note that there is only 1 form each for "we (exclusive)," "you (plural)" and "they."

Favorlang
The following Favorlang personal pronouns are from Li (2003:8). All of them are free forms. All genitive pronouns end with -a.

Atayalic
The Wulai and Mayrinax Atayal personal pronouns below are sourced from Huang (1995). In both varieties, the nominative and genitive forms are bound while the neutral and locative ones are free (unbound).

Wulai Atayal

Mayrinax Atayal

Teruku Seediq

East Formosan

Siraya
The Siraya personal pronouns below are from Adelaar (1997).

Taivoan 
The Taivoan personal pronouns:

Kavalan
The Kavalan personal pronouns below are from Li (2006:30).

Basay
The Basay personal pronouns below are from Li (1999:639).

Bunun
Takivatan Bunun personal pronoun roots are (De Busser 2009:453):
1s: -ak- 
2s: -su-
3s: -is-
1p (incl.): -at-
1p (excl.): -ðam-
2p: -(a)mu-
3p: -in-

The tables of Takivatan Bunun personal pronouns below are sourced from De Busser (2009:441).

Iskubun Bunun personal pronouns are somewhat different (De Busser 2009:454).

Paiwan
The Kuɬaɬau Paiwan personal pronouns below are from Ferrell (1982:14).

Puyuma
The Nanwang Puyuma personal pronouns below are from Teng (2008:61-64).

Malayo-Polynesian languages

Philippine languages

Ilokano
Ilokano personal pronouns distinguish three cases: absolutive, ergative, and oblique. They also distinguish three numbers: singular, dual and plural.

Accent marks in the following table are not written, but given here for pronunciation purposes.

Tagalog
Like nouns, Tagalog personal pronouns are categorized by case. As above, the indirect forms also function as the genitive.

Cebuano
Like nouns, Cebuano personal pronouns are categorized by case.

*The two sets of tag-iya case function similarly except that the primary tag-iya would need the unifying linker nga and the modifier tag-iya cannot be used as complementary adjective.
**The final syllable of a primary tag-iya pronoun is mostly dropped.

When the pronoun is not the first word of the sentence, the short form is more commonly used than the full form.

*When the object is a second person pronoun, use ta instead of ko.

Malay
The informal pronouns aku, kamu, engkau, ia, kami, and kita are indigenous to Malay. However, there are more personal pronouns according to formality, see more at Malay grammar.

Possessive pronouns
Aku, kamu, engkau, and ia have short possessive enclitic forms. All others retain their full forms like other nouns, as does emphatic dia: meja saya, meja kita, meja anda, meja dia "my table, our table, your table, his/her table".

Javanese

Javanese lacks some personal pronouns. For the first person plural, Javanese use awaké dhèwè, literally meaning "the body itself" (cf. Malay : badannya sendiri) or just dhèwè, that originally means "itself" or "alone". For the third person singular, Javanese uses dhèwèké that means "itself", from  + -k- (archaic glottal stop)+ -(n)é (3rd person possessive enclitic), or ' that means "the person", from wong (person)+ -(n)é (3rd person possessive enclitic, that is also used for demonstrative). 
The rest of plural pronouns uses words kabèh/sedaya/sedanten, all of them meaning "all" after the singular form.

Possessive pronouns
, and  have short possessive enclitic forms.

Polynesian languages

Tongan
The Tongan cardinal pronouns are the main personal pronouns which in Tongan can either be preposed (before the verb) or postposed (after the verb). The first are the normal pronouns, the latter the stressed pronouns, which are also used as reflexive pronouns.

Samoan
Like many Austronesian languages, Samoan has separate words for inclusive and exclusive we, and distinguishes singular, dual, and plural. The root for the inclusive pronoun may occur in the singular, in which case it indicates emotional involvement on the part of the speaker.

In formal speech, fuller forms of the roots mā-, tā-, and lā- are ‘imā-, ‘itā-, and ‘ilā-.

Hawaiian

The a-class possessive pronouns refer to alienable possession, as with boats, children, clothing, and spouses. The o-class possessive pronouns refer to inalienable (incapable of being begun or ended) possession, as with parents and body parts.

See also
 :Category:Pronouns by language
 Fossilized affixes in Austronesian languages

Notes and references

Further reading

 Li, Paul Jen-kuei. 1997. "A Syntactic Typology of Formosan Languages – Case Markers on Nouns and Pronouns." In Li, Paul Jen-kuei. 2004. Selected Papers on Formosan Languages. Taipei, Taiwan: Institute of Linguistics, Academia Sinica.

Pronouns by language
Austronesian languages
Malayo-Polynesian languages
Formosan languages
Philippine languages
Languages of Southeast Asia